Mark R. Treaster (May 17, 1954) is a Democratic former member of the Kansas House of Representatives and businessman.  He served the Kansas 101st district from 2005-2009.  In 2012, he ran for the 34th district of the Kansas Senate, but lost in the general election to incumbent Terry Bruce.  While in the state house, he served on the House Transportation Committee.

Before entering politics and business, Treaster was an educator in Pretty Prairie, Kansas and Concordia, Kansas.  He earned a Bachelor of Science in Secondary Education in 1977 and a Master of Science in Learning Disabilities in 1991, both from Emporia State University.

In 2010, he was named to the USDA Farm Service Agency state committee in Kansas and still holds the position as of January 2016.

References

Democratic Party members of the Kansas House of Representatives
Living people
People from Reno County, Kansas
Emporia State University alumni
People from Concordia, Kansas
1954 births
21st-century American politicians